Chapman is an unincorporated community in Phillips County, in the U.S. state of Montana.

History
A post office was established at Chapman in 1929, and remained in operation until it was discontinued in 1955. The community was named for A. P. Chapman, a railroad agent.

References

Unincorporated communities in Phillips County, Montana
Unincorporated communities in Montana